Archibald Kennedy is the name of:

 Archibald Kennedy, 11th Earl of Cassilis (died 1794)
 Archibald Kennedy, 1st Marquess of Ailsa (1770–1846)
 Archibald Kennedy, Earl of Cassilis (1794–1832)
 Archibald Kennedy, 2nd Marquess of Ailsa (1816–1870)
 Archibald Kennedy, 3rd Marquess of Ailsa (1847–1938)
 Archibald Kennedy, 4th Marquess of Ailsa (1872–1943)
 Archibald Kennedy, 7th Marquess of Ailsa (1925–1994)
 Archibald Kennedy, 8th Marquess of Ailsa (1956–2015)

See also 
 Archibald M. Kennedy (1818–1897)